DECIPHER is a software toolset that can be used to decipher and manage biological sequences efficiently using the programming language R. Some functions of the program are accessible online through web tools.

Features 
 Sequence databases: import, maintain, view, and export sequences.
 Multiple sequence alignment: align sequences of DNA, RNA, or amino acids.
 Genome alignment: find and align the syntenic regions of multiple genomes.
 Oligonucleotide design: primer design for polymerase chain reaction (PCR), probe design for fluorescence in situ hybridization (FISH) or DNA microarrays.
 Manipulate sequences: trim low quality regions, correct frameshifts, reorient nucleotides, determine consensus, or digest with restriction enzymes.
 Analyze sequences: find chimeras, detect repeats, predict secondary structure, classify into a taxonomy of organisms or functions, create phylogenetic trees, and ancestral reconstruction.
 Gene finding: predict coding and non-coding genes in a genome, extract them from the genome, and export them to a file.

See also 

 Sequence alignment software

References

External links 

Phylogenetics software